The 2011 CAF Champions League group stage matches took place between July and September 2011. The matchdays were: 15–17 July, 29–31 July, 12–14 August, 26–28 August, 9–11 September, and 16–18 September.

The group stage featured the eight winners from the second round. They were divided into two groups of four, where they played each other home-and-away in a round-robin format. The top two teams in each group advanced to the semifinals.

Seeding
The draw for the group stage took place on 15 May 2011, at the CAF Headquarters in Cairo.

The procedures for the group stage draw were announced on 12 May 2011. The teams were seeded into four pots, and each group contains one team from each pot.

Notes:
Ranking score for teams is by their individual team 2006–2010 CAF 5-Year Ranking, the same ranking used to seed teams in the qualifying rounds.
† Winner of play-off due to disqualification of TP Mazembe

Tiebreakers
The order of tie-breakers used when two or more teams have equal number of points is:
 Number of points obtained in games between the teams concerned;
 Goal difference in games between the teams concerned;
 Goals scored in games between the teams concerned;
 Away goals scored in games between the teams concerned;
 Goal difference in all games;
 Goals scored in all games;
 Drawing of lots.

Groups

Group A

Group B

References

External links
CAF Champions League

Group stage